The Society, more fully The Society under the patronage of Saint Wilfrid and Saint Hilda and formerly known as The Society of Saint Wilfrid and Saint Hilda, is an independent association of Church of England clergy and lay people which defines itself as "an ecclesial body, led by a Council of Bishops" which rejects the ordination of women. It is supported by Forward in Faith and administered by its director.

The Society's stated purposes are:

History
Plans for creation of The Society were announced on 24 September 2010 by a group of bishops of the Church of England who do not ordain women to the priesthood. This was in preparation for the new situation that would arise following the ordination of women to the episcopate. Its council of bishops began to meet regularly in 2013. In 2014, its members appointed a bishop's representative for each diocese of the Church of England. Registration began in 2014 of male transitional or permanent deacons and female permanent deacons as "Deacons of The Society" and male priests as "Priests of The Society".

Council of bishops
The Society's council of bishops are Church of England bishops. The following bishops are currently on the council:

 Tony Robinson, Bishop of Wakefield, chairman of the council of bishops
 Stephen Race, Bishop of Beverley
 Philip North, Bishop of Burnley
 Martin Warner, Bishop of Chichester
 Jonathan Baker, Bishop of Fulham
 Paul Thomas, Bishop of Oswestry
 Norman Banks, Bishop of Richborough
 Roger Jupp, Superior-General of the Confraternity of the Blessed Sacrament

Jonathan Goodall, former Bishop of Ebbsfleet joined the Roman Catholic Church in 2021. Mark Sowerby, former Bishop of Horsham, was previously a member of The Society and its council of bishops. In June 2015, he announced that he had changed his views on the ordination of women and resigned from the council.

See also

 :Category:Anglo-Catholic churches in England receiving AEO

References

External links
 

Anglican realignment
Anglo-Catholicism
Church of England societies and organisations
Organisations based in the London Borough of Camden
Religion in the London Borough of Camden